Matt Berry (born 1974) is an English actor.

Matt Berry may also refer to:

People 
 Matthew Berry (born 1969), American sports analyst
 Matthew Berry (politician) (born 1972), American politician
 Arthur Massey Berry (1888–1970), Canadian bush pilot

Places 
 Matt Berry, Edmonton, a neighbourhood of Edmonton, Alberta, Canada

See also
 Matt Barrie (disambiguation)